Riverwood International Charter School is a charter school located in Sandy Springs, Georgia, United States. Riverwood is one of Fulton County School's four magnet sites, offering International Studies and International Baccalaureate Programs.  The school’s vision is to deliver a challenging curriculum that gives all students the tools needed to be successful, contributing members of our nation and the world.

Notable alumni
 Becky Albertalli - American novelist known for the YA novel Simon vs. the Homo Sapiens Agenda
Kate Bedingfield - current White House Communications Director
 Jay Busbee - American journalist, novelist, sportswriter
 Amaechi Morton - collegiate runner (Stanford University), participated in the 2012 Summer Olympics (Nigeria)
Gabriel Sterling - Chief Operating Officer of the Georgia Secretary of State's office
 Tyler Thornburg - professional baseball player (Cincinnati Reds)

References

External links
Riverwood International Charter School

Fulton County School System high schools
High schools in Sandy Springs, Georgia
Magnet schools in Georgia (U.S. state)
Charter schools in Georgia (U.S. state)